MaryEllen Miller is an Australian senior career officer with the Department of Foreign Affairs and Trade (DFAT) and was Assistant Secretary, Non-Government Organisations & Volunteers Branch from 2014 until 2017 before being named Ambassador to Denmark in 2017.  She is also accredited to Norway and Iceland. Her term as Ambassador ended in December 2020.

Miller earned a Bachelor of Education from the University of Canberra. She was a teacher from 1989 until 1996 before moving into government roles.

References

Ambassadors of Australia to Denmark
University of Canberra alumni
Living people
Date of birth missing (living people)
Ambassadors of Australia to Iceland
Ambassadors of Australia to Norway
Australian women ambassadors
Year of birth missing (living people)